Boris Denič (born 12 September 1967) is a Slovenian handball coach and former player. He coached the Slovenia men's national handball team between 2010 and 2015.

Career 
Denič played as a goalkeeper. He earned 52 appearances for the Slovenia national team.

References

1967 births
Living people
Slovenian male handball players
Slovenian handball coaches
Handball coaches of international teams
Slovenian expatriate sportspeople in Saudi Arabia